The 1896 Welsh Cup Final, the 19th in the competition, was contested by Bangor and Wrexham at the Council Field, Llandudno. Bangor won 3–1.

Route to the final

Bangor

Bangor's route to the final took seven games, with their first against Llandudno Swifts being forced into extra time. Bangor travelled to the venue of that year's final to face the 'Swifts', where drawing the game 2–2 after 90 minutes, Bangor won 3–2 in extra time.

In the second round, Bangor received a bye into the third, due to no teams being close enough to travel to, and there they welcomed Westminster Rovers to their Maes y Dre field.  Another draw, 1–1, after 90 minutes the game was replayed at Westminster, where Bangor won 3–1.

In the Fourth Round, Bangor once again draw 1–1, this time against Wellington St George. The game was replayed, once again at Maes y Dre.

Now only one game from the Bangor's second final, they faced last years winners Newtown. Taking the game to another 1–1 draw, Bangor went on to win 3–0 in the replay. Both games were played at the home of the final opponents, the Racecourse Ground.

Wrexham
As runners-up in the previous years Welsh Cup, Wrexham joined the 1896 competition in the fourth round.

Match

Report

Detail

See also

Notes

References

Bibliography

Notes

External links 
RSSSF: Wales - List of Cup Finals
Welsh Football Data Archive: WELSH CUP 1895/96
Welsh Football Data Archive: WELSH CUP FINAL 1895/96

1896
Final
1895–96 in Welsh football
Bangor City F.C. matches
Wrexham A.F.C. matches